"Ever Be" is a song by Bethel Music and Kalley Heiligenthal. The song was released as the second track on Bethel Music's seventh live album, We Will Not Be Shaken (Live) (2015), on January 26, 2015. The song was written by Bobby Strand, Chris Greely, Gabriel Wilson, and Kalley Heiligenthal.

"Ever Be" peaked at number 22 on the US Hot Christian Songs chart. It has been certified gold by Recording Industry Association of America (RIAA). "Ever Be" was nominated for the GMA Dove Award Worship Song of the Year at the 2017 GMA Dove Awards.

"Ever Be" has been covered by several notable artists such as Natalie Grant, Aaron Shust, Shane & Shane, and Anthony Evans. Aaron Shust's version is the most commercially successful cover, having peaked at number eleven on the Hot Christian Songs chart.

Background
Kalley Heiligenthal shared the story behind the song, saying:

Composition

Reception

Critical response
Timothy Yap of JubileeCast described the song as "a turbo-charged power ballad that leaves one breathless with all the high octave soaring notes." In a ChurchMag review, Michael Ernest listed "Ever Be" as one of his album favourites from We Will Not Be Shaken (2015), saying Kalley Heiligenthal's voice is "daring, yet soulful."

Accolades

Commercial performance
Following the release of the We Will Not Be Shaken, "Ever Be" debuted at number 22 on the US Hot Christian Songs dated February 14, 2022. The song spent a total of twenty weeks on the chart.

Music videos
The live music video of the song was released by Bethel Music on January 26, 2015, having been recorded at Shasta Lake and is part of the concert film We Will Not Be Shaken directed by Nathan Grubbs and Luke Manwaring.

The official lyric video of the song was released on January 26, 2015, also on Bethel Music's YouTube channel.

Charts

Certifications

Aaron Shust version

Aaron Shust released a multi-track EP titled Ever Be on January 29, 2016 in digital format.

Background
On January 27, 2016, Aaron Shust announced that he will be releasing a new EP titled Ever Be on January 29, 2016, while also publishing a devotional. Prior to that, Shust had announced on December 2, 2015, that his version of "Ever Be" will impact Christian radio on February 5, 2016. The Ever Be EP has three songs: two songs which are produced by Ed Cash (the title track and "Fear Not"), and one song produced by Christian Paschall ("God Evermore"); "God Evermore" being the only song co-written by Shust. Shust spoke about his version of the song, saying:

Critical reception
Jonathan Andre of 365 Days of Inspiring Media praised Shust's rendition of the song, saying "Aaron's imaging of this fan favourite has been nothing less than powerful and poignant."

Commercial performance
Aaron Shust's version of "Ever Be" debuted at number 36 on the US Hot Christian Songs dated February 14, 2022. The song peaked at number eleven and spent a total of thirty weeks on the chart.

Music videos
The official lyric video of the song was released on January 26, 2015, also on Aaron Shust's YouTube channel.

The live music video of the song, recorded in Nashville, was released by Aaron Shust via YouTube on April 7, 2017.

Track listing

Charts

Weekly charts

Year-end charts

Release history

Other versions
 Bethel Music released an instrumental remix of the song on their instrumental album, Without Words: Synesthesia (2015).
 Natalie Grant released her cover of "Ever Be" on her studio album, Be One (2015).
 Bethel Music Kids released their version of the song on their debut album, Come Alive (2015).
 Anthony Evans released an R&B-infused rendition of "Ever Be" on his album, Back to Life (2017).
 Shane & Shane released their cover of the song on their album, The Worship Initiative, Vol. 12 (2017).

References

External links
  on PraiseCharts

2015 songs
2016 singles
Bethel Music songs